Old Abingdonians are former pupils of Abingdon School or, in some cases, Honorary Old Abingdonians who have been awarded the status based on service to the School. The Old Abingdonians also run the Old Abingdonian Club (OA club) which is an organisation hosted by the school. It was founded in 1743.

Born in the 12th century
 St Edmund Rich (St Edmund of Abingdon) (c.1174–1240), Archbishop of Canterbury 1233–1240 (may have attended Abingdon)

Born in the 16th century

 Sir John Bennet (1552–1627), Chancellor of the Diocese of York, Judge and politician
 William Bennet (1553–1609), MP and founder of the Bennet scholarship
 John Blacknall (1583–1625), land and mill owner and founder of Blacknall bequest
 Sir John Mason (1502–1566), diplomat, spy, and Chancellor of Oxford University
 Robert Payne (1596–1651), English cleric and academic
 John Roysse (1500–1571), mercer, re-endowed Abingdon School in 1563
 Sir Thomas Smith, (1556?–1609), Judge and Member of Parliament
 Christopher Tesdale (1592–1655),  member of the Westminster Assembly, of Divines
 Thomas Tesdale (1547–1610), maltster and benefactor, established the Tesdale Ushership

Born in the 17th century

 Phanuel Bacon (1699–1783), playwright, poet and author
 Clement Barksdale (1609–1687), religious author, polymath and Anglican priest
 Colwell Brickenden (1663–1714), clergyman and Master of Pembroke College, Oxford
 Colonel James Bringfeild, (1656–1706), equerry to Prince George of Denmark and Aide-de-camp to the Duke of Marlborough
 Joseph Cox (1697–1753), High Sheriff of Berkshire
 Walter Dayrell (1610–1684), Archdeacon of Winchester
 Walter Harte (1650–1735) Prebendary of Bath and Wells and a principal pillar of the Nonjuring schism cause
 Sir John Holt (1642–1710), Lord Chief Justice
 William Hunt (1669–1733), Archdeacon of Bath
 James Jennings (1670–1739), MP and landowner
 Henry Langley (1610–1679), nonconformist minister and Master of Pembroke College, Oxford
 Matthew Panting (1682–1739), Master of Pembroke College, Oxford
 Sir Edward Turnour (1617–1686), Speaker of the House of Commons

Born in the 18th century

 William Adams (1706–1789), Master of Pembroke College, Oxford
 Sir Henry Atkins (1726–1742), 5th Baronet of Clapham
 Sir Richard Atkins (1728–1756), 6th Baronet of Clapham & High Sheriff
 Francis Ayscough (1701–1763), courtier, and Dean of Bristol
 Lord James Beauclerk (1709–1787), Bishop of Hereford, 1746–1787
 Richard Brickenden (1701–1779), Archdeacon of Wiltshire
 Sir Charles Bagot Chester, 7th Baronet (1724–1755), 7th Baronet of Chicheley
 John Bush (High Sheriff) (1745–?), High Sheriff of Oxfordshire
 John Clarke (1732–1781), Provost of Oriel College, Oxford
 William Wiseman Clarke (1759–1826), High Sheriff of Berkshire
 Sir Francis Clerke, 7th Baronet (1748–1777), baron, killed at Battles of Saratoga
 Sir William Clerke, 8th Baronet (1751–1818), baron and clergyman
 Sir Henry D'Anvers, 4th Baronet (1731–1758), 4th Culworth baronet
 Sir Michael D'Anvers, 5th Baronet (1738–1776), High Sheriff of Northamptonshire
 James Dashwood (1715–1779), politician
 Henry Dawkins (1728–1814), Member of Parliament
 James Dawkins (1722–1757), antiquary and Jacobite
 Sir John D'Oyly, 4th Baronet (1702–1773), 4th baronet of Chislehampton
 William Horton (c.1708–1749), leading military aide and builder of Horton House
 Daniel Dumaresq (1712–1805), St Petersburg Academy of Sciences, educationalist
 Thomas Dudley Fosbroke, (1770–1842), antiquary
 James Gerard (1741–1783), Warden of Wadham College, Oxford
 Richard Graves (1715–1804), clergyman, writer and translator
 George William Hall (1770–1843), Master of Pembroke College, Oxford
 William Hawkins (1722–1801), clergyman, poet and dramatist
 Sir Thomas Head (1715–1779), High Sheriff of Berkshire
 Henry Howe (1716–1781), 3rd Baron Chedworth
 John Howe (1714–1762), 2nd Baron Chedworth
 William Huddesford (1732–1772), Keeper of the Ashmolean Museum
 Clement Hue (1779–1861), physician
 Sir Justinian Isham, 7th Baronet (1740–1818), High Sheriff of Northamptonshire
 Sir Robert Jenkinson, 5th Baronet (1720–1766), 5th Baronet of Walcot and Hawkesbury
 George Knapp (1754–1809), British Member of Parliament for Abingdon
 John Loder (c.1726–1805), clergyman, landowner and founder of the Old Berkshire Hunt
 Edward Morant, (1730–1791), Member of Parliament
 Philip Morant (1700–1770), historian
 John Morton (c. 1716–1780), MP
 William Newcome (1729–1800), Bishop and Archbishop of Armagh
 John Nourse (1705–1780), bookseller
 John Ratcliffe (1700–1775), clergyman and Master of Pembroke College, Oxford
 George Rowley (1782–1836), Master of University College, Oxford
 Clement Saxton (1724–1810), High Sheriff of Berkshire
 William Sergrove (1746–1796), clergyman and Master of Pembroke College, Oxford
 John Smyth (1744–1809), clergyman and Master of Pembroke College, Oxford
 Thomas Stock (1750–1803), social reformer, established the first Sunday school in England
 Major-General John Tombs (1777–1848), British East India Company and Indian Army
 Henry Leigh Tracy, 8th Viscount Tracy (1732–1797), 8th Viscount Tracy
 John Tracy (1722–1793), Viscount and Warden of All Souls College
 William Walker (1704–1761), Principal of New Inn Hall
 Philip Wenman, 6th Viscount Wenman (1719–1760), politician
 Thomas Whorwood (1718–1771), High Sheriff of Oxfordshire.

Born in the 19th century

 Sir William Boxall (1800–1879), painter, director of the National Gallery
 James Brooks (1825–1901), Gothic Revival architect
 Sir Michael Bruce (1894–1957), author, traveller and adventurer
 Nigel Bruce (1895–1953), actor
 Oswald Couldrey (1882–1958), author and watercolourist
 Louis Davis (1860–1941), Arts and Crafts stained glass artist
 Charles Harvey Dixon (1862–1923), politician
 John William Duncan (1885–1963), Welsh field hockey international
 Edward Ede (1834–1908), cricketer, Hampshire CCC
 George Ede (1834–1870), cricketer, captain, Hampshire CCC & Grand National winner 1868
 Harold Gilman (1876–1919), painter, founder member of the Fitzroy Group
 Henry Rudge Hayward (1831–1912), Archdeacon of Cheltenham and Cirencester
 Colonel Lacey Robert Johnson (1858–1915), Canadian Pacific Railway pioneer
 Thomas Malcolm Layng (1892–1958), Deputy Chaplain-General to the Forces, 1945, and Archdeacon of York
 Henry Medd (1892–1977), architect and church designer in Delhi
 John Theobald Milne (1895–1917), English fighter pilot and flying ace
 Edward Dorrien Newbolt (1843–1889), British Army officer
 Tracy Philipps (1888–1959), intelligence officer (Arab Bureau), later colonial official and conservationist
 Arthur Edwin Preston (1853–1942), mayor of Abingdon, Master of Christ’s Hospital
 Harry Redfern (1861–1950), architect
 Richard Rice, (1886–1939), 1912 Summer Olympics athlete
 William Henry Richardson (1836–1909), historian
 Norman Riches (1883–1975), cricketer, captain, Glamorgan CCC
 William Collinson Sawyer (1832–1868), Bishop of Grafton and Armidale, New South Wales
 William Alder Strange (1813–1874), headmaster and author
 Major-General Sir Henry Tombs VC KCB  (1824–1874), Indian Mutiny Victoria Cross
 Willoughby Weaving (1885–1977), First World War poet
 Eric Whelpton (1894–1981), author and traveller

Born in the 20th century

 Roger Ainsworth+ (1951–2019), professor and Master of St Catherine's College, Oxford
 Sir Clive Alderton KCVO (born 1967), British diplomat and courtier
 James Allison (born 1968), designer, engineer, and technical director of Mercedes
 Sir Eric Anderson+ (1936–2020), teacher and educator
 Jamie Anderson (born 1985), producer
 Mark Andrews (1959–2020), University boat race rower
 Phil Baker (born 1975), rowing world championship medallist
 Michael Bartlett (born 1980), playwright and actor
 Michael Bateman (1932–2006), journalist and author
 John Beyer (born 1950), former government ambassador
 Roger Blackmore (born 1941), politician and Lord Mayor of Leicester
 Brigadier Robert Bowkett (1954–2002), British Army officer
 Robin Bourne-Taylor (born 1981), Olympic rower
 James Bowler (born 1973), civil servant
 Peter Bradley (born 1953), Labour MP for the Wrekin
 Mark Bretscher (born 1940), biological scientist, FRS
 Commodore David Brice (born 1942), retired Royal Navy officer
 Nick Brodie (born 1986), University boat race cox
 Theo Brophy-Clews (born 1997), rugby union player
 Will Carter Keall (born 1997), EHL premier division hockey player
 Edward Castle, Baron Castle (1907–1979), British journalist and politician
 Terence Charley (1916–2008), Japanese prisoner of war
 Sir Paul Robert Virgo Clarke KCVO (born 1953), government official
 Brigadier Tony Clay OBE, CBE (1930–2015), British Army officer
 Jamie Cook (born 1992), University boat race rower
 Oliver Cook (born 1990), international and world champion rower
 Major General Walter Courage MBE, CB (born 1940), retired British Army officer
 Cecil Davidge (1901–1981), lawyer and academic of Keble College, Oxford
 Sir Kim Darroch KCMG (born 1954), senior British diplomat
 Dawson Bros., comedy writers
 Tim Dawson (born 1988), screenwriter
 John Dewar, (born 1959), academic and law specialist
 Sir Chris Dobson (1949–2019), professor and academic, FRS
 Thomas Dolby (born 1958), musician and producer
 Jonny Donahoe (born 1983), comedian and writer
 Nicholas Drake (born 1975), England rugby sevens and London Irish 
 Jon Dunbar (born 1980), international rugby union player
 Dick Eason (1902–1978), University boat race blue
 Colonel David Eccles OBE, CBE (born 1957), British Army officer
 Edward Wilson (Eddie Eyre) (born 1988), actor
 Anthony Fawcett (born 1948), writer, art critic, and a former personal assistant to John Lennon
 Alex Fisher (born 1990), professional footballer 
 Andrew Fisher (born 1965), physicist
 Michael Fortescue (born 1946), professor and academic
 Sir Andrew Foster (born 1944), British public servant
 Colonel Jonathan Frere MBE (born 1952), retired British Army officer
 Justin Frishberg (born 1972), Paralympic Games wheelchair rugby player
 Ben Gannon (born 1975), professional cricketer
 Alex Greaney (born 1975), University boat race cox
 Theo Green (born 1973), film composer, Oscar winner
 John William Greening MBE (1922–2010), benefactor and philanthropist
 Colin Greenwood (born 1969), member of Radiohead
 Jonny Greenwood (born 1971), member of Radiohead
 Magnus Gregory (born 1998), England international canoeist
 Michael Grigsby (1936–2013), film-maker
 Bruce Duncan Guimaraens (1935–2002), port wine maker, head of Guimaraens Taylor Fonseca, Oporto
 Commodore Alistair Halliday (born 1959), Royal Navy officer
 Graham Halsey (born 1960), England U-23 and Harlequins rugby player
 The Hon.Jonathan Hamberger (born 1959), government official awarded Public Service Medal (Australia)
 Matthew Harding (1953–1996) businessmen and vice-chairman of Chelsea Football Club
 Martin Haycock (born 1973), University boat race cox
 Robert Hayward, Baron Hayward OBE (born 1949), Conservative MP for Kingswood
 Michael Hill (born 1951), English cricketer
 Sir John Hills, (1954–2020) professor and academic
 Michael Holding, (born 1958), filmmaker and director
 Tom Hollander (born 1967), actor
 Michael Howat (born 1958), English cricketer
 Martin Hyder (born 1961), actor and writer
 Adam Janisch (born 1975), English cricketer
 Philip Johnson (born 1972), lead architect for the London Stadium for the London 2012 Olympic Games
 Toby Jones (born 1966), actor
 Eddy Joseph (born 1945), sound engineer
 Sir Nicholas Kay KCMG (born 1958), British diplomat
 Tom Kempinski (born 1938), playwright and actor
 Joseph Kennedy (born 1981), actor
 Robin Kermode (born 1958), communication coach and former actor
 Bryan Kibble (1938–2016), British physicist, inventor of the Kibble balance
 Martin Landray, physician, epidemiologist and data scientist 
 Nicholas Lemoine, (born 1957) professor and academic
 Martin Lisemore (1939–1977), television producer
 Hugh Lunghi (1920–2014), British military interpreter and Foreign Office
 Ben Macintyre (born 1963), author and journalist
 Richard McMahon (born 1962), Bailiff of Guernsey
 Angus McPhail (born 1956), cricketer and warden of Radley College
 Toby Marlow (born 1994), writer and composer
 Francis Maude (born 1953), MP for North Warwickshire and Horsham, Chairman of the Conservative Party
 Ian Middleton (born 1995), university boat race cox
 David Mitchell (born 1974), comedian and actor
 Chris Newman (born 1990), field hockey international 
 Felix Newman (born 1993), University boat race rower
 Air Vice Marshal Steven Nicholl CBE (born 1946), retired Royal Air Force officer
 Ed O'Brien (born 1968), member of Radiohead
 Tim Parker (born 1955), former chairman of the National Trust
 Sir Robert Pasley (born 1965), Pasley baronets and CFO of Cell C
 Christopher John Pickup OBE, LVO (born 1942), retired British Army officer
 Brigadier General Nick Pond, MBE (born 1967), British Army officer
 Nigel Powell (born 1971), musician
 David Pringuer (born 1972), musician
 Charlie Quarterman (born 1998), professional cyclist
 Sir Vivian Ramsey (born 1950), former High Court judge
 Andrew Robson (born 1964), international bridge player, teacher and columnist
 Kieran Roche (born 1983), EHL premier division hockey player
 Toby Roche (born 1988), EHL premier division hockey player
 Colin Ronan (1920–1995), British author and specialist in the history and philosophy of science
 Matthew Rossiter (born 1989), international and European champion rower
 Graham Scott (born 1968), Premier League referee
 Philip Selway (born 1967), member of Radiohead
 Commodore Andrew Stacey (born 1969), Royal Navy Officer
 Sir George Sinclair (1912–2005), colonial administrator and Conservative MP for Dorking
 Raymond Stross (1916–1988), film producer and director
 Sir David Tanner CBE (born 1947), British Olympic rowing coach
 Richard Tauwhare (born 1959), Governor of the Turks and Caicos Islands
 Fin Taylor (born 1990), stand-up comedian
 Russell Taylor (born 1960), writer, journalist and composer
 Rob Walker (born 1975), sports commentator and television presenter
 Timothy Walker (born 1958), botanist and former Horti Praefectus of Oxford Botanic Garden and Harcourt Arboretum
 Nathaniel Watkins (born 1991), professional cricketer
 Michael Philip Westwood OBE (born 1944), retired Royal Air Force wing commander
 George Whittaker (born 1981), rower
 Richard Wilson (born 1968), CEO of TIGA
 Brigadier Christopher Winfield CBE (born 1944), retired British Army officer
 Christopher Wray (1940–2014) actor and businessman
 Wayne Yip (born 1981), film and TV director
 Andy Yorke (born 1972), musician
 Thom Yorke (born 1968), member of Radiohead
 Kit Young (born 1994), actor

The symbol + denotes Honorary status.

Born in the 21st century
 Charlie Atkinson (born 2001), rugby player

See also
 Abingdon School Boat Club
 Abingdon Film Unit

References

Abingdon